Bruno Zuculini (born 2 April 1993) is an Argentine professional footballer who plays as a central midfielder for River Plate.

Club career

Racing Club
Born in Belén de Escobar, Zuculini graduated from Racing Club's youth setup. He made his first-team debut on 13 February 2010, starting in a 1–0 away loss against Gimnasia La Plata for the Argentine Primera División championship, and aged only 16.

Zuculini appeared in further six matches during the campaign, and also played 12 during 2011–12. On 17 June 2012, he scored his first professional goal, but in a 4–2 away loss against Atlético de Rafaela.

In the 2012–13 season, after the departures of Giovanni Moreno and Lucas Nahuel Castro, Zuculini was an ever-present figure for the Avellaneda side, appearing in 32 matches and scoring five goals. On 27 September 2013 he renewed his link with the club, running until 2016.

Manchester City
On 23 July 2014, Zuculini scored the opening goal of Manchester City's pre-season match against Sporting Kansas City. On 8 August, he was officially confirmed as a City player, being assigned the number 36 shirt.

Zuculini made his competitive debut two days later in the 2014 FA Community Shield, replacing Yaya Touré after 60 minutes of an eventual 3–0 defeat to Arsenal at Wembley Stadium.
On 10 July 2015, it was confirmed that he would be in the club's squad for their pre-season tour in Australia.

Valencia (loan)
On 19 August 2014, Zuculini was loaned to La Liga's Valencia CF in a season-long deal. He made his debut in the competition on 29 August 2014, coming on at half time for André Gomes in a 3–0 home win against Málaga CF.

On 30 January 2015, Zuculini's loan was rescinded, after appearing just 45 minutes for the Che.

Córdoba (loan)
Hours after rescinding with Valencia, Zuculini joined fellow league team Córdoba CF on loan until June. The team were relegated in last place in the league, and Spanish newspaper Marca named him in their worst team of the season.

Middlesbrough (loan)
Following loan spells in Spain, Zuculini made his first loan move to an English club on 26 October 2015 as he joined Championship club Middlesbrough on a month-long loan.

On 25 November 2015, the loan was extended to 2 January 2016.

AEK Athens (loan)
Zuculini was on loan at AEK Athens until the end of the 2016 Greek Superleague campaign. On 4 February 2016, he made his debut with the club, in an away 1–0 win against Iraklis at Kaftanzoglio Stadium for Greek Cup helping his club to advance to semi finals.
On 23 February 2016, Argentine midfielder Zuculini suffered a serious fracture injury in the metatarsal and had to return to England in order to undergo surgery.

Rayo Vallecano (loan)
Zuculini signed on loan for Rayo Vallecano until the end of the 2016–17 Segunda División campaign. On 17 January, after only nine league matches, his loan was cut short and he joined his brother at Verona.

Hellas Verona
After spending the second half of the 2016–17 on loan at Hellas Verona, Zuculini signed a permanent deal with the club on 11 July 2017.

Personal life
Zuculini's older brother Franco is also a footballer and a midfielder. He too was groomed at Racing Club, with both playing together in 2011.

Career statistics

Honours
AEK Athens
 Greek Cup: 2015–16

References

External links

 Argentine Primera statistics at Futbol XXI

1993 births
Living people
People from Escobar Partido
Sportspeople from Buenos Aires Province
Argentine people of Italian descent
Argentine footballers
Argentina under-20 international footballers
Association football midfielders
Racing Club de Avellaneda footballers
Manchester City F.C. players
Valencia CF players
Córdoba CF players
Rayo Vallecano players
Middlesbrough F.C. players
AEK Athens F.C. players
Hellas Verona F.C. players
Club Atlético River Plate footballers
Argentine Primera División players
La Liga players
Segunda División players
English Football League players
Super League Greece players
Serie B players
Serie A players
Argentine expatriate footballers
Expatriate footballers in England
Argentine expatriate sportspeople in England
Expatriate footballers in Spain
Argentine expatriate sportspeople in Spain
Expatriate footballers in Greece
Argentine expatriate sportspeople in Greece
Expatriate footballers in Italy
Argentine expatriate sportspeople in Italy